EEO may refer to:
 Electroendosmosis
 Equal employment opportunity
 European Enforcement Order